Balanoglossus is a genus of ocean-dwelling acorn worms (Enteropneusta). It has zoological importance because, being hemichordates, they are an "evolutionary link" between invertebrates and vertebrates. Balanoglossus is a deuterostome, and resembles the sea squirts (Ascidiacea) in that it possesses branchial openings, or "gill slits". It has a notochord in the upper part of the body and has no nerve chord. It does have a stomochord, however, which is a gut chord within the collar. Their heads may be as small as per 2.5 mm (1/10 in) or as large as 5 mm (1/5 in).

Discovery
The discovery of gill-slits in this animal by Alexander Kovalevsky (1865) led to the creation of the class Enteropneusta by Karl Gegenbaur (1870).

Classification
William Bateson (1885) originally included them in phylum Chordata. Hyman (1959), however, placed them near Echinodermata and gave Hemichordata a status of an independent phylum.

Habitat
Balanoglossus is a tuberculos (burrowing) and exclusively marine animal. It is found in shallow waters between tide marks along the coast of warm and temperate oceans.

Species
The World Register of Marine Species lists the following species:
 Balanoglossus apertus Spengel, 1893
 Balanoglossus aurantiaca Girard, 1853
 Balanoglossus australiensis Hill, 1894
 Balanoglossus biminiensis Willey, 1899
 Balanoglossus borealis Willey, 1899
 Balanoglossus capensis Gilchrist, 1908
 Balanoglossus carnosus Willey, 1899
 Balanoglossus clavigerus Delle Chiaje, 1829
 Balanoglossus gigas Müller in Spengel, 1893
 Balanoglossus hydrocephalus van der Horst, 1940
 Balanoglossus jamaicensis Willey, 1899
 Balanoglossus misakiensis Kuwano, 1902
 Balanoglossus natalensis Gilchrist, 1908
 Balanoglossus numeensis Maser, 1913
 Balanoglossus occidentalis Ritter, 1902
 Balanoglossus parvulus Punnett, 1903
 Balanoglossus proterogonius Belichov, 1928
 Balanoglossus robinii Giard, 1882
 Balanoglossus salmoneus Belichov, 1928
 Balanoglossus simodensis Miyamoto & Saito, 2007
 Balanoglossus stephensoni van der Horst, 1937
 Balanoglossus studiosorum van der Horst, 1940

References

Enteropneusta
Hemichordate genera